Sverre Halvorsen may refer to:

Sverre Halvorsen (illustrator)
Sverre Halvorsen (professor)
Sverre Halvorsen, a Norwegian film director.